Cot Gapu Stadium was a multi-use stadium in Bireuën, Indonesia.  It is used mostly for football matches and is home stadium of PSSB Bireun. The stadium holds 15,000 people.

Footnotes

Rugby union stadiums in Indonesia
Football venues in Indonesia
Sports venues in Indonesia
Buildings and structures in Aceh